Mariya Koryttseva and Tatiana Poutchek were the defending champions but decided not to participate.
Irina Buryachok and Valeria Solovyeva won the final 6–3, 6–2 against Eva Birnerová and Alberta Brianti.

Seeds

Draw

Draw

References
 Main Draw

Baku Cup – Doubles
2012 Doubles